Céline Semaan-Vernon is a Lebanese-Canadian designer, writer, and activist. She is the founder of  Slow Factory Foundation, a 501c3 public service organization. She is on the Council of Progressive International, became a Director's Fellow of MIT Media Lab in 2016, and served on the Board of Directors of AIGA NY, a nonprofit design organization.

Career
Semaan began her career as a designer and community organizer; she worked as a user-experience designer for HUGE Inc., General Assembly, and Condé Nast. Semaan works in the open knowledge and access to information movement, working with Creative Commons to bring the open licensing to Montreal, Lebanon and Qatar. Founding Slow Factory in 2012 while living in Montreal quickly brought her to New York in 2013 to continue to expand the intersection of environmental sustainability, social good, and fashion.

As an artist and designer her work has been featured in the Museum of Modern Art and Cooper Hewitt in New York, the de Young Museum in San Francisco.

Semaan is a recognized expert in the space of environmental and social justice. She coined the term fashion activism, and has also worked extensively to raise awareness of other issues and causes around social and environmental justice by broadening her platform, such as bringing the word ”decolonize” to the pages of popular fashion magazines

She is known for her activism in social justice causes especially around refugees, cultural appropriation, and Arab identity, her advocacy for sustainable practices in fashion, and her work as a digital and product designer.

References

External links
 Land Acknowledgement - Study Hall New York Times
 Labor Acknowledgement In Advance Of Black History Month - Study Hall New York Times

1982 births
Living people
Writers from Beirut
Lebanese fashion designers
Lebanese expatriates in the United States
Lebanese activists
Lebanese women activists
Lebanese women fashion designers
Artists from Beirut